Alopecurus carolinianus is a species of grass known by the common names Carolina foxtail and tufted foxtail.

Distribution
It is native to much of North America, including most of the United States and western Canada. It may be an introduced species in many areas, however. It is most common in moist areas.

Description
This is an annual bunchgrass forming tufts of erect stems up to about half a meter tall. The leaves are 8 to 15 centimeters in maximum length. The inflorescence is dense, cylindrical, and only a few centimeters long. It blooms in yellow to bright orange anthers.

References

 Everitt, J.H., Drawe, D.L., Little, C.R., and Lonard, R.I. 2011. Grasses of South Texas. Texas Tech University Press, Lubbock, Texas. 336 pp.

External links
Jepson Manual eFlora (TJM2) treatment of Alopecurus carolinianus
USDA Plants Profile for Alopecurus carolinianus
Grass Manual Treatment
UC Photos gallery — Alopecurus carolinianus

carolinianus
Bunchgrasses of North America
Grasses of the United States
Grasses of Canada
Native grasses of California
Native grasses of the Great Plains region
Native grasses of Nebraska
Native grasses of Oklahoma
Native grasses of Texas
Grasses of Alabama
Plants described in 1788